ortho-Vanillin (2-hydroxy-3-methoxybenzaldehyde) is an organic solid present in the extracts and essential oils of many plants. Its functional groups include aldehyde, ether and phenol. ortho-Vanillin, a compound of the formula C8H8O3, is distinctly different from its more prevalent isomer, meta-vanillin. The "ortho-" prefix refers to the position of the compound’s hydroxyl moiety, which is found in the para-position in vanillin.

ortho-Vanillin is a fibrous, light-yellow, crystalline solid. Present in a variety of food products, it is not specifically sought after, and is therefore a less-commonly produced and encountered food additive.

History 
ortho-Vanillin was first isolated, in 1876, by renowned German chemist Ferdinand Tiemann.   By 1910, methods for its purification had been developed by Francis Noelting, who similarly demonstrated its versatility as a general synthetic precursor for a diverse array of compounds, such as the coumarins.

By 1920, the compound began to show use as a dye for hides.

Biological properties 
ortho-Vanillin is harmful if ingested, irritating to eyes, skin and respiratory system, but has an unmistakable high  of 1330 mg/kg in mice.

It is a weak inhibitor of tyrosinase, and displays both antimutagenic and comutagenic properties in Escherichia coli. However, its net effect makes it a “potent comutagen”.

ortho-Vanillin possesses moderate antifungal and antibacterial properties.

Uses 
Today, most ortho-vanillin is used in the study of mutagenesis and as a synthetic precursor for pharmaceuticals, for example, benafentrine and an antiandrogen compound called Pentomone.

See also
 Vanillin
 2-Hydroxy-5-methoxybenzaldehyde
 Isovanillin
 2-Hydroxy-4-methoxybenzaldehyde

Notes 

Hydroxybenzaldehydes
Flavors
Perfume ingredients